Vasilisa Alekseyevna Bardina (born 30 November 1987) is a Russian former professional tennis player.

As of 10 August 2007, her highest ranking was world No. 48, achieved in early 2007. She has won 3 ITF Women's Circuit singles titles and 3 ITF doubles titles, but not any WTA titles in singles or doubles.

Biography

Father's name is Alexey Bardin, mother's name is Svetlana. She speaks Russian and English.

Tennis career

Vasilisa made the final of Moorilla Hobart International in 2007, before losing to Anna Chakvetadze.

She was forced off the tour after Wimbledon in 2007 due to injury, she had suffered a stress fracture in her right shin. She tried to come back at the Australian Open in 2008, but it was too soon after her injury and she had only been practicing for two weeks before the event. She lost in straight sets to Sandra Kloesel in qualifying.  It was around this time that Bardina split from her coach, her father Alexey Bardin, whom she has described as a "pushy Dad".  Bardina made a few tentative appearances at ITF events in North America in 2009 with limited success.

Bardina moved to Denver and worked as a coach at the Evergreen Sports Center, which is where she met former pro Jeff Salzenstein in 2011, who has starting coaching her. Under Salzenstein's guidance, Bardina won the US Open National Playoffs Intermountain Sectional Qualifying Tournament held at the Gates Tennis Center in Denver without dropping a set, which meant she could then play the US Open National Playoffs for a Wildcard into the qualifying draw of the main event.

Bardina's goal is to reach the top 10.

WTA career finals

Singles: 1 (0-1)

ITF Circuit finals

Singles 8 (3–5)

Doubles 5 (3–2)

References

External links
 
 

1987 births
Living people
Tennis players from Moscow
Russian expatriates in the United States
Russian female tennis players